Judge Bryant may refer to:

David Ezekiel Bryant (1849–1910), judge of the United States District Court for the Eastern District of Texas
Ed Bryant (born 1948), magistrate judge of the United States District Court for the Western District of Tennessee
Frederick Howard Bryant (1877–1945), judge of the United States District Court for the Northern District of New York
Randolph Bryant (1893–1951), judge of the United States District Court for the Eastern District of Texas
Vanessa Lynne Bryant (born 1954), judge of the United States District Court for the District of Connecticut
William B. Bryant (1911–2005), judge of the United States District Court for the District of Columbia

See also
Diana Bryant (born 1947), chief justice of the Family Court of Australia
Judge Bryan (disambiguation)